Kiran is a free Devanagari typeface and a non-Unicode clip font created by Kiran Bhave first released in 1999.

History
In 1999 Kiran Bhave could not find a suitable font for typing Marathi that was free after considerable searching. Thus, he was inspired to create a new typeface.

Description
The keyboard layout is an enhanced version of the Shivaji typeface and have the same keyboard layout. The typeface is used create websites using the Devanagari script.

Creator
Kiran Bhave (Marathi: किरण भावे) is from Sanpada (East), Navi Mumbai.

Timeline
 1999: kiran.ttf was created
 2000: The amruta.ttf and aarti.ttf fonts were created
 2001: Website KiranFont.com was registered and made operational
 2004: KF-Kiran.ttf, KF-Amruta.ttf, KF-Aarti.ttf, KF-Aditya.ttf, KF-Arun.ttf, KF-Mitra, KF-Ravi were made available for a fee
 2006: The ability to pay using PayPal was added
 2008: KF-Kiran.ttf, KF-Amruta.ttf, KF-Aarti.ttf became free. Support for kiran.ttf, amruta.ttf, and aarti.ttf was discontinued to provide a consistent keyboard layout for free and paid users
 2010: A free tool to convert text from Unicode to the Kiran font was made available
 2012: The Indian Rupee Currency Symbol was added in all the fonts. The character is mapped at ASCII 0226 (Alt+0226) and its official Unicode code point U+20b9
 2012: KF-Prachi.ttf, KF-Jui.ttf were released as free fonts
 2012: KF-Bhaskar.ttf was released for a fee
 2013: An offline version of Unicode to KF conversion tool was released
 2013: The enhanced conversion tool to convert TO and FRO KF - UNICODE was made available 
2018: 30 July: Created multiple packages including FREE version for different users need.
2018: 30 July: Released 11th font KF-Laxman in the JUMBO pack

See also
 Indic computing
 Kruti Dev
 Clip font

References

Devanagari typefaces
Indic computing
Typefaces and fonts introduced in 1999
Clip fonts
Typefaces